Javad Ashtiani (born 20 August 1981) is an Iranian footballer who plays for Saipa in the IPL.

Club career
Ashtiani has played for Saipa F.C. since 2005.

Club career statistics
Last Update  4 August 2011 

 Assist Goals

References

1981 births
Living people
Saipa F.C. players
Iranian footballers
Association football midfielders